The 5th Vijay Awards ceremony honoring the winners and nominees of the best of Tamil film industry in 2010 was held on 25 June 2011 in Chennai.

Award categories
Winners from 32 various categories like Best Film, Best Actor Male/Female, Best Supporting Actor Male/Female, Best Comedian, Best Villain, Best Playback Singer Male/Female, Best Debut Actor Male/Female, Best Choreographer, Best Film Editor, Best Lyricist, Best Art Director, Best Dress Designer, Best Dialogue Writer are few of the awards that would be selected by the Jury members.

Jury members
The Jury members for the Fifth Annual Vijay Awards are the Popular Writer/Director/Producer Yugi Sethu, Actress Radhika Sarathkumar, Karthik, Director A. R. Murugadoss and Cinematographer Ravi. K. Chandran.

Award winners and nominees
Winners are highlighted and nominees are listed in the list below.

Jury awards

Favorite Awards

References

External links
 Winners List

Vijay Awards
2010 Indian film awards